Introduction to Christianity is a 1968 book written by Joseph Ratzinger (Pope Emeritus Benedict XVI). Considered one of his most important and widely read books, it presents a "narrative Christology" that demonstrates the place for faith is in the Church. The book offers a "remarkable elucidation of the Apostle's Creed" and gives an "excellent, modern interpretation of the foundations of Christianity".

Overview
Originally published in German in 1968 under the title Einführung in das Christentum, Ratzinger restates the Apostles' Creed and the meaning of this foundational text in language that has a greater contemporary resonance than the Creed itself. Like the Apostles' Creed, the book presents the doctrines pertaining to the Father, the Son, and the Spirit in sequence.

Editions
The English edition of Introduction to Christianity was revised in 2000 by Ignatius Press with a new preface by Joseph Ratzinger. A second revised edition was released in 2004 by Ignatius Press.

References
Notes

Citations

External links
 Ignatius Press
 Google Books

Books about Christianity
Books by Pope Benedict XVI
1968 non-fiction books
1968 in Christianity
Ignatius Press books